Utricularia recta is a small, probably annual carnivorous plant that belongs to the genus Utricularia. It is native to Bhutan, China, India, and Nepal. It was originally described as a variety of U. wallichiana by Daniel Oliver in 1859. It was later transferred to a variety of U. scandens by Krishnaier Subramanyam and Banerjee in 1968. Peter Taylor elevated the variety to the specific rank in 1986 upon further review of its morphological characteristics.

See also 
 List of Utricularia species

References 

Carnivorous plants of Asia
Flora of Bhutan
Flora of China
Flora of Assam (region)
Flora of Nepal
recta